Caitlin Ann Gurrey (born 3 May 1995) is a New Zealand cricketer. In January 2019, she was named in New Zealand's squad for their series against India. She made her Women's Twenty20 International cricket (WT20I) debut for New Zealand against India on 6 February 2019.

On 16 December 2022, Gurrey equalled Suzie Bates' record for the highest score in New Zealand women's domestic one day cricket, scoring 183 off of 145 balls against Central Districts.

References

External links
 
 

1995 births
Living people
New Zealand women cricketers
New Zealand women Twenty20 International cricketers
Cricketers from Wellington City
Northern Districts women cricketers